Lanea is an extinct conodont genus in the family Spathognathodontidae from the Early Devonian.

References

External links 

 
 Lanea at fossilworks.org (retrieved 7 May 2016)

Ozarkodinida genera
Early Devonian fish
Devonian conodonts